Reham Magdy Medhat Al Baroudi, known as Reem al-Baroudi (born 6 October 1978) is an Egyptian actress. She began her career in 1994.

Career
She complete her study in Tourism and Hotels college. she began her career as model in ads. her first acting rule was in Earth secret TV series in 1994. her most famous other roles was in Constitution our masters in 1995, A woman who shake Egypt crown in 1995 with Nadia Al-Gindi, Satan gardens with Jamal Suliman and Somaya El Khashab, Womans heart in 2007 with Ilham Shaheen, System point in 2007, Albateneya in 2009 with Ghada Abdel Razek, Mountain kingdom in 2010, The escapers in 2010, Elephant in napkin in 2011, Ya ana ya howa in 2011, Abed Karman in 2011, The Scorpion in 2013, The doubt in 2013, Abo oghto in 2014, Girls dandle in 2014, Zigzag in 2014, Chess in 2015, Seven girls in 2016, Halimo legend of beaches in 2017, Family restriction in 2019. she won Artist award as best actress for her role in Family restriction from Ministry of Culture of Algeria.

Personal life
After years of relationship with singer Ahmed Saad, they married in 2017, but divorced after 21 days. Ahmed Saad shortly after the divorce married actress Somaya El Khashab. Reem al-Baroudi accused Somaya ElKhashab of cheating on her by taking her husband. She is second cousin of Shams al-Baroudi and third cousin of Ghada Adel.

Works

TV Series

Films

Stage

References

External links
 Reem Al Baroudi in IMDb

1978 births
Living people
Egyptian film actresses
Egyptian stage actresses
21st-century Egyptian actresses